Abdussalam Al Qadi is a Libyan politician who served as the third deputy prime minister between November 2012 and 29 August 2014.

Education
Qadi received a bachelor's degree in science from Sebha University. Then he obtained a master's degree in olive oil extraction technology from Spain.

Career
Qadi worked in the sectors of agriculture and industry as a manager. In November 2012, Qadi was appointed by Prime Minister Ali Zeidan as the third deputy prime minister. Qadi's term ended on 29 August 2014 when the cabinet resigned.

References

Living people
Government ministers of Libya
Year of birth missing (living people)